Day One is the first studio album from Snob Scrilla, released on the 24 April 2009 in Australia, by the record label, Ivy League Records.

Track listing
 "Nuclear Sunrise" – 2:53
 "Houston" – 4:05
 "Timmy Declears War" – 0:44
 "ALIENation" – 2:50
 "Chasing Ghosts" – 4:03
 "Heartbreak Scorsese" – 3:22
 "There You Go Again" – 3:20
 "King John" – 7:24
 "Already Gone" – 3:44
 "........" – 2:42
 "THE3SECONDRULE" – 1:35
 "It's On You" - 4:14
 "Spaceship" - 4:14
 "Hardest Times" - 6:30

iTunes Track listing
 "Nuclear Sunrise" – 2:53
 "Houston" – 4:05
 "Timmy Declears War" – 0:44
 "ALIENation" – 2:50
 "Chasing Ghosts" – 4:03
 "Heartbreak Scorsese" – 3:22
 "There You Go Again" – 3:20
 "King John" – 7:24
 "Already Gone" – 3:44
 "........" – 2:42
 "THE3SECONDRULE" – 1:35
 "It's On You" - 4:14
 "Spaceship" - 4:14
 "Hardest Times" - 6:30
 "Gasoline Dreams" - 3:57
 "Criminal" - 3:40

Tracks in bold are bonus tracks exclusive to iTunes

Charts

References

External links
 Album Information, Track Listing
 Album listed on Sanity

Ivy League Records albums
2009 debut albums
Snob Scrilla albums